The men's doubles tournament at the 1983 Australian Open was held from 29 November through 11 December 1983 on the outdoor grass courts at the Kooyong Stadium in Melbourne, Australia. Mark Edmondson and Paul McNamee won the title, defeating Steve Denton and Sherwood Stewart in the final.

Seeds

Draw

Finals

Top half

Section 1

Section 2

Bottom half

Section 3

Section 4

External links
 1983 Australian Open – Men's draws and results at the International Tennis Federation

Men's Doubles
Australian Open (tennis) by year – Men's doubles